Laurence Breuls is an Australian actor. Breuls made his television debut portraying the character Nelson McFarlane on Home and Away in 1995, and his film debut playing the lead role of Jared in the 1997 film Blackrock. Breuls performance in Blackrock was praised by David Rooney from Variety, who said Breuls "kept his intensity cranked to just the right level, making it easy to empathize with the character."

Filmography
Film

TV

References

External links
 

Australian male film actors
Living people
Year of birth missing (living people)